In mathematics, the Bernoulli polynomials, named after Jacob Bernoulli, combine the Bernoulli numbers and binomial coefficients. They are used for series expansion of functions, and with the Euler–MacLaurin formula.

These polynomials occur in the study of many special functions and, in particular, the Riemann zeta function and the Hurwitz zeta function.  They are an Appell sequence (i.e. a Sheffer sequence for the ordinary derivative operator). For the Bernoulli polynomials, the number of crossings of the x-axis in the unit interval does not go up with the degree. In the limit of large degree, they approach, when appropriately scaled, the sine and cosine functions.

A similar set of polynomials, based on a generating function, is the family of Euler polynomials.

Representations

The Bernoulli polynomials Bn can be defined by a generating function. They also admit a variety of derived representations.

Generating functions
The generating function for the Bernoulli polynomials is

The generating function for the Euler polynomials is

Explicit formula

for n ≥ 0, where Bk are the Bernoulli numbers, and Ek are the Euler numbers.

Representation by a differential operator

The Bernoulli polynomials are also given by

where D = d/dx is differentiation with respect to x and the fraction is expanded as a formal power series. It follows that 

cf. integrals below. By the same token, the Euler polynomials are given by

Representation by an integral operator

The Bernoulli polynomials are also the unique polynomials determined by

The integral transform

on polynomials f, simply amounts to 

This can be used to produce the inversion formulae below.

Another explicit formula

An explicit formula for the Bernoulli polynomials is given by

That is similar to the series expression for the Hurwitz zeta function in the complex plane. Indeed, there is the relationship

where ζ(s, q) is the Hurwitz zeta function. The latter generalizes the Bernoulli polynomials, allowing for non-integer values of n.

The inner sum may be understood to be the nth forward difference of xm; that is,

where Δ is the forward difference operator. Thus, one may write

This formula may be derived from an identity appearing above as follows. Since the forward difference operator Δ equals

where D is differentiation with respect to x, we have, from the Mercator series,

As long as this operates on an mth-degree polynomial such as xm, one may let n go from 0 only up to m.

An integral representation for the Bernoulli polynomials is given by the Nörlund–Rice integral, which follows from the expression as a finite difference.

An explicit formula for the Euler polynomials is given by

The above follows analogously, using the fact that

Sums of pth powers

(assuming 00 = 1).

The Bernoulli and Euler numbers
The Bernoulli numbers are given by 

An alternate convention defines the Bernoulli numbers as 

The two conventions differ only for  since .

The Euler numbers are given by

Explicit expressions for low degrees
The first few Bernoulli polynomials are:

 

The first few Euler polynomials are:

Maximum and minimum

At higher n, the amount of variation in Bn(x) between x = 0 and x = 1 gets large. For instance,

which shows that the value at x = 0 (and at x = 1) is −3617/510 ≈ −7.09, while at x = 1/2, the value is 118518239/3342336 ≈ +7.09. D.H. Lehmer showed that the maximum value of Bn(x) between 0 and 1 obeys

unless n is 2 modulo 4, in which case

(where  is the Riemann zeta function), while the minimum obeys

unless n is 0 modulo 4, in which case

These limits are quite close to the actual maximum and minimum, and Lehmer gives more accurate limits as well.

Differences and derivatives

The Bernoulli and Euler polynomials obey many relations from umbral calculus:

(Δ is the forward difference operator). Also,

These polynomial sequences are Appell sequences:

Translations

These identities are also equivalent to saying that these polynomial sequences are Appell sequences.  (Hermite polynomials are another example.)

Symmetries

where

Fourier series

The Fourier series of the Bernoulli polynomials is also a Dirichlet series, given by the expansion

Note the simple large n limit to suitably scaled trigonometric functions.

This is a special case of the analogous form for the Hurwitz zeta function

This expansion is valid only for 0 ≤ x ≤ 1 when n ≥ 2 and is valid for 0 < x < 1 when n = 1.

The Fourier series of the Euler polynomials may also be calculated.  Defining the functions

and

and

and

They are related to the Legendre chi function  as

and

Inversion
The Bernoulli and Euler polynomials may be inverted to express the monomial in terms of the polynomials.

Specifically, evidently from the above section on integral operators, it follows that  

and

Relation to falling factorial
The Bernoulli polynomials may be expanded in terms of the falling factorial  as

where  and

denotes the Stirling number of the second kind. The above may be inverted to express the falling factorial in terms of the Bernoulli polynomials:

where

denotes the Stirling number of the first kind.

Multiplication theorems
The multiplication theorems were given by Joseph Ludwig Raabe in 1851:

For a natural number ,

Integrals
Two definite integrals relating the Bernoulli and Euler polynomials to the Bernoulli and Euler numbers are:

Another integral formula states

with the special case for

Periodic Bernoulli polynomials
A periodic Bernoulli polynomial  is a Bernoulli polynomial evaluated at the fractional part of the argument .  These functions are used to provide the remainder term in the Euler–Maclaurin formula relating sums to integrals.  The first polynomial is a sawtooth function.

The following properties are of interest, valid for all :

See also
 Bernoulli numbers
 Bernoulli polynomials of the second kind
 Stirling polynomial
 Polynomials calculating sums of powers of arithmetic progressions

References

 Milton Abramowitz and Irene A. Stegun, eds. Handbook of Mathematical Functions with Formulas, Graphs, and Mathematical Tables, (1972) Dover, New York. (See  Chapter 23)
  (See chapter 12.11)

 
  (Reviews relationship to the Hurwitz zeta function and Lerch transcendent.)

External links
 A list of integral identities involving Bernoulli polynomials from NIST

Special functions
Number theory
Polynomials